is a 1990 motorcycle arcade racing game developed and manufactured by Sega, released in Japan, North America and Europe. It was released as two-player arcade cabinets, in the form of a ride-on motion simulator cabinet and a standard upright cabinet. It was ported to the Sega Master System and Game Gear in 1993.

Ports
The Master System version is played in split-screen mode (similar to the Genesis port of OutRunners) regardless of if one or two players are playing. If only one player is racing then the second player is replaced by a computer opponent called "Wayne" (possibly a reference to Wayne Rainey), who plays like a human player in that his performance varies from race to race, in contrast to most racing games of the era, where the main opponent is programmed to always finish in the same position.

The Game Gear version is essentially a rebranded port of Super Hang-On, featuring assets and gameplay from that game.

Reception

In Japan, Game Machine listed GP Rider on their November 15, 1990 issue as being the fourth most-successful upright arcade unit of the month. It went on to be Japan's sixth highest-grossing dedicated arcade game of 1991.

The arcade game received positive reviews upon release. The One  in 1991 called it a "realistic motorcycle simulation" and praised its graphics, expressing that GP Rider has "amazingly smooth scrolling" and "great new gradient effects". The One also praised GP Rider's motorcycle controller hardware as "realistic" and adding to the game's atmosphere. The One noted GP Rider was "the first motorcycle game that lets you race against another player", and expressed that this competitive "head-to-head excitement with a superb implementation and ultra realistic bike handling [makes GP Rider] something well worth major coin investment."

Notes

References

See also
Hang-On
Racing Hero

External links

1990 video games
Arcade video games
Motorcycle video games
Master System games
Game Gear games
Sega-AM2 games
Sega arcade games
Video games designed by Yu Suzuki
Video games developed in Japan
Video games scored by Hiroshi Kawaguchi
Video games scored by Takenobu Mitsuyoshi